Hugh Kellyk (fl.c.1480) was an English composer, whose tree surviving works are preserved in the Eton Choirbook. These two works are a five-part Magnificat and a seven-part Gaude flore virginali, which appear to be among the earlier pieces in the choirbook. Gaude Flore Virginali was recorded by The Sixteen in 1994, the Magnificat by Tonus Peregrinus.

References

15th-century English people
English composers